Nandikeshwari Temple, also known as Nandikeshwari Tala, is located in Sainthia city of West Bengal. This temple is part of the
famous Shakti Peethas in Indian Subcontinent.

Name
The name of Goddess is derived from 'Nandi', the mascot and follower of Lord Shiva, and 'Ishwari' (Goddess), meaning ‘one who is worshiped by Nandi, the divine bull.

History
The history of the Nandikeshwari Temple is linked with the event of Sati's self-sacrifice at the Yajna Sabha of her father Daksha, because Daksha insulted Sati and her husband, Shiva. It is believed that the necklace of Sati's corpse fell here to form the Shakti Peetha when the Sudarshan Chakra of Lord Vishnu mutilated the corpse of Sati from the arms of Lord Shiva to reduce his rage.
The present temple was built in 1913, the Bengali year of 1320.

Idol

The main idol in the temple is a black stone, which is now almost red, as devotees use sindur to pray the holy stone as Nandikeshwari. The idol is adorned with a silver crown and three golden eyes.

Temple Premises
There are several temples within the boundary among which Ram-Sita temple, Shiva temple, Maha Saraswati temple, Maha Laxmi-Ganesha temple, Laxmi-Narayana temple, Radha Govinda temple, Bhairav Nandikeshwari temple, Hanuman (Bajrangbali) temple deserves special mention. There is a huge sacred banyan tree where the devotees bind red and yellow threads to fulfill their wishes.

References

External links 

Hindu pilgrimage sites in India
Hindu temples in Birbhum district
20th-century Hindu temples
20th-century architecture in India